Zindel is both a surname and a given name. Notable people with the name include:

Bonnie Zindel, American psychotherapist and psychoanalyst
Lizabeth Zindel, American writer, director and producer
Paul Zindel (1936–2003), American playwright, young adult novelist and educator
Tonia Maria Zindel (born 1972), Swiss actress
Zindel Segal (born 1956), Canadian psychologist